Bennington is a city in Douglas County, Nebraska, United States. The population was 1,458 at the 2010 U.S. Census.

History
Bennington was originally called Bunz Town, and under the latter name was founded in the 1880s when the Fremont, Elkhorn and Missouri Valley Railroad was extended to that point. The present name is after the town of Bennington, Vermont.

Geography
Bennington is located at  (41.365747, -96.156395).

Demographics

2010 census
As of the census of 2010, there were 1,458 people, 556 households, and 388 families living in the city. The racial makeup of the city was 96.9% White, 0.8% African American, 0.2% Native American, 0.1% Asian, 1.0% from other races, and 1.0% from two or more races. Hispanic or Latino of any race were 1.9% of the population.

There were 556 households, of which 42.3% had children under the age of 18 living with them, 55.8% were married couples living together, 10.6% had a female householder with no husband present, 3.4% had a male householder with no wife present, and 30.2% were non-families. 25.9% of all households were made up of individuals, and 11.5% had someone living alone who was 65 years of age or older. The average household size was 2.62 and the average family size was 3.18.

The median age in the city was 37.1 years. 29.9% of residents were under the age of 18; 5.9% were between the ages of 18 and 24; 26.6% were from 25 to 44; 24.5% were from 45 to 64; and 13% were 65 years of age or older. The gender makeup of the city was 47.9% male and 52.1% female.

2000 census
As of the census of 2000, there were 937 people, 346 households, and 255 families living in the city. The population density was 2,428.7 people per square mile (927.6/km2). There were 359 housing units at an average density of 930.5 per square mile (355.4/km2). The racial makeup of the city was 98.40% White, 0.21% Native American, 0.53% Asian, and 0.85% from two or more races. Hispanic or Latino of any race were 1.49% of the population.

There were 346 households, out of which 40.5% had children under the age of 18 living with them, 58.4% were married couples living together, 11.3% had a female householder with no husband present, and 26.3% were non-families. 22.5% of all households were made up of individuals, and 12.7% had someone living alone who was 65 years of age or older. The average household size was 2.71 and the average family size was 3.23.

In the city, the population was spread out, with 30.6% under the age of 18, 8.0% from 18 to 24, 30.3% from 25 to 44, 19.7% from 45 to 64, and 11.3% who were 65 years of age or older. The median age was 34 years. For every 100 females, there were 89.3 males. For every 100 females age 18 and over, there were 83.6 males.

As of 2000 the median income for a household in the city was $47,067, and the median income for a family was $53,917. Males had a median income of $36,438 versus $25,000 for females. The per capita income for the city was $20,416. About 4.0% of families and 5.5% of the population were below the poverty line, including 3.7% of those under age 18 and 18.5% of those age 65 or over.

References

External links
 History of Bennington University of Nebraska - Lincoln.]

Cities in Nebraska
Cities in Douglas County, Nebraska